Chameleon is a stealth-action video game developed by Silver Wish Games and released in 2005. The game was released in a limited quantity in a limited number of countries and has never been released in western markets. The development was already finished in 2003 but it was published in 2005.

Gameplay 
The game focuses on stealth. Players can use spy equipment such as night vision goggles, binoculars, minicams, or cameras. Necessary gadgets are picked up automatically before a mission but some can be added by the player themselves if they want them. In-game weapons include Desert Eagle, Colt 1911, MP5, AK-47, IMI Mini Uzi, Dragunov and mini-crossbow.

Plot 
The story focuses on a nameless former CIA agent who saw the death of his parents when he was a child. He tries to find the killers of his parents and take revenge. His investigation leads him to various locations around the world.

Reception 
The game received generally positive reviews from critics. It currently holds 78% on MobyGames and 75% on HodnoceniHer.cz (Czech aggregator site).

References 

2005 video games
2K Czech games
Spy video games
Stealth video games
Take-Two Interactive games
Third-person shooters
Video games developed in Slovakia
Video games set in Afghanistan
Video games set in Albania
Video games set in Argentina
Video games set in Baltimore
Video games set in Colombia
Video games set in Cuba
Video games set in Ireland
Video games set in Lebanon
Video games set in Moldova
Video games set in Northern Ireland
Windows games
Windows-only games
Video games developed in the Czech Republic